The eleventh and final season of 7th Heaven—an American family-drama television series, created and produced by Brenda Hampton. It premiered on September 25, 2006, on The CW, and concluded on May 13, 2007 (22 episodes). It is the final season of the series. Stephen Collins, Catherine Hicks, Beverley Mitchell, and Mackenzie Rosman are the only cast members to star in all eleven seasons of the series, along with Happy the dog.

Cast and characters

Main
 Stephen Collins as Eric Camden
 Catherine Hicks as Annie Camden (episodes 1-2, 5-22)
 Beverley Mitchell as Lucy Camden-Kinkirk 
 Mackenzie Rosman as Ruthie Camden (16 episodes)
 Nikolas and Lorenzo Brino as Sam and David Camden
 George Stults as Kevin Kinkirk 
 Tyler Hoechlin as Martin Brewer
 Haylie Duff as Sandy Jameson
 Happy as Happy the Dog

Recurring
 Colton James as Theodore "T-Bone" Jr (18 episodes)
 Sarah Wright as Jane (18 episodes)
 Andrea Morris as Margaret (18 episodes)
 Kyle Searles as Mac (10 episodes)

Production
After much deliberation within the now-defunct WB network, it was made public in November 2005 that season ten would be the program's final because of high costs, which were revealed to be due to a poorly negotiated licensing agreement by the WB network a few years earlier. The program's future was hanging in the balance and it was entirely in the hands of the newly established CW network whether to renew it for an additional season. In March 2006, the main cast of characters were approached about the possibility of returning for another season.

After further consideration by the CW network, it was decided three days after the airing of its "series finale", that 7th Heaven would be picked up for an eleventh season, which would air on their network in the Monday-night slot that had helped make it famous. Originally the show was renewed for thirteen episodes, but on September 18, 2006, the renewal was extended to a full twenty-two episodes.

Along with the show's unexpected and last-minute renewal came some changes. First, David Gallagher choose not to return as Simon. Then, the show's already-low budget was moderately trimmed, forcing cuts in the salaries of some cast members and shortened taping schedules (seven days per episode instead of the typical eight).Furthermore, Mackenzie Rosman, who played youngest daughter Ruthie, did not appear in the first six episodes. Catherine Hicks missed three episodes in season 11, as another cost-cutting move. Additionally, George Stults was absent for a few episodes at the beginning of season 11. 

Also, after airing Monday nights at 8/7c for ten seasons, plus the first two episodes of season 11, the CW unexpectedly moved 7th Heaven to Sunday nights as of October 15, 2006. The Sunday/Monday lineup swap was attributed to mediocre ratings of shows on both nights. While 7th Heaven did improve in numbers over the CW's previous Sunday night programming, it never quite hit its Monday-night momentum again, and the shows that replaced it in its slot on Monday night never matched what it had achieved in that time slot.

Episodes

References

2006 American television seasons
2007 American television seasons